Elliptorhina javanica, also known as the Halloween hisser, is a large species of wingless cockroach native to the island of Madagascar.

Description

Its common name derives from its black and orange-yellow striped coloration and its hissing sound when disturbed, which is produced when they forcefully expel air through the specially-adapted respiratory openings (spiracles) on the fourth segment of their body. Body length varies around 35–50 mm for females, and 40–50 mm in males.

References

Insects described in 1930
Cockroaches
Insects of Madagascar